Uttar Krishnapur Part-I is a census town in Cachar district in the Indian state of Assam.

Demographics
 India census, Uttar Krishnapur Part-I had a population of 5129. Males constitute 52% of the population and females 48%. Uttar Krishnapur Part-I has an average literacy rate of 64%, higher than the national average of 59.5%: male literacy is 69%, and female literacy is 59%. In Uttar Krishnapur Part-I, 14% of the population is under 6 years of age.

References

Cities and towns in Cachar district
Silchar